Estonian Archery Federation (abbreviation EAF) is one of the sport governing bodies in Estonia which deals with archery.

EAF is established in 1991, being a successor of Estonian SSR Archery Sport Federation. EAF is a member of World Archery Federation (WA) and Estonian Olympic Committee.

References

External links
 

Sports governing bodies in Estonia
Shooting sports in Estonia
National members of the European and Mediterranean Archery Union